Moussaieff is a surname of Arabic origin that may refer to:

 Moussaieff Red Diamond, a 5.11-carat fancy red diamond
 Moussaieff ostracon, a pottery fragment with a forged text

People with the surname
Dorrit Moussaieff (born 1950), First Lady of Iceland
Jeffrey Moussaieff Masson (born 1941), American author
Shlomo Moussaieff (businessman) (1925–2015), Israeli-born millionaire in London
Shlomo Moussaieff (rabbi) (1852–1922), rabbi and gemstone trader from Uzbekistan, and founder of the Bukharim neighborhood of Jerusalem

Jewish surnames